The men's 56 kg weightlifting competitions at the 1968 Summer Olympics in Mexico City took place on 13 October at the Teatro de los Insurgentes. It was the sixth appearance of the bantamweight class.

Results

References

Weightlifting at the 1968 Summer Olympics